Kawashima v. Holder, 565 U.S. 478 (2012), is a United States Supreme Court case in which the Court held that "filing a false tax return in violation of 26 U.S.C. Section 7206 qualifies as an aggravated felony under the Immigration and Nationality Act when the Government's revenue loss exceeds $10,000."

Background 
Akio and Fusako Kawashima, Japanese nationals who legally resided in the U.S., owned the successful Nihon Seibutsu Kagaku restaurant in Thousand Oaks, California which filed false tax returns.

Opinion of the Court 
In a 6—3 opinion written by Justice Clarence Thomas, the Court held that "filing a false tax return in violation of 26 U.S.C. Section 7206 qualifies as an aggravated felony under the Immigration and Nationality Act when the Government's revenue loss exceeds $10,000."

See also 
 Immigration and Nationality Act

References

External links 
 
 Coverage of the case on SCOTUSblog

United States Supreme Court cases
2012 in United States case law
United States immigration and naturalization case law
United States taxation and revenue case law
History of Thousand Oaks, California
Japanese restaurateurs
Restaurants in California
Japan–United States relations
United States Supreme Court cases of the Roberts Court